Zahra Newman is a Jamaican-born Australian actress.

Newman was born in Port Antonio Jamaica and spent her formative years in Kingston before migrating to Australia at the age of 14 with her mother. Her interest in the performing arts was nurtured through her involvement with Father HoLung and Friends, the Caribbean-style music and theatre arts group associated with Missionaries of the Poor. Later, in Brisbane Australia, performance opportunities with Harvest Rain Theatre Company served to cement her passion for and commitment to the stage. She graduated from the Victorian College of the Arts in 2008.

She appeared as Nabalungi in the original Australian cast of The Book of Mormon.

Newman has performed extensively with leading theatre companies in Melbourne and Sydney. Her theatre credits include Miss Julie, The Effect, The Mountaintop, The Cherry Orchard, Clybourne Park, The Drowsy Chaperone, Richard III and Rockabye for Melbourne Theatre Company; Rosalind in As You Like It for Bell Shakespeare; The Blind Giant is Dancing, Ivanov and Private Lives for Belvoir; Love and Information for Malthouse Theatre and Sydney Theatre Company; The Government Inspector for Belvoir and Malthouse Theatre; and Random for the Sydney Opera House, Melbourne Theatre Company and Brisbane Powerhouse. She also appeared in the original Australian cast of the musical An Officer and A Gentleman.

Her television and film credits include Wentworth, Rush, Childhood’s End and Neighbours.

In 2014, Newman was nominated for Helpmann Awards for both Best Female Actor in Play for The Mountaintop and Best Female Actor in a Supporting Role in a Play for The Government Inspector. She received a Green Room Award for Female Actor for Random in 2012.

Filmography

References

External links 

Living people
Australian film actresses
Australian stage actresses
Australian television actresses
Australian actors of African descent
Australian people of Jamaican descent
Jamaican emigrants to Australia
Jamaican film actresses
Jamaican stage actresses
Jamaican television actresses
People from Kingston, Jamaica
People from Portland Parish
21st-century Australian actresses
21st-century Jamaican actresses
Year of birth missing (living people)